Alcester Grammar School (AGS) is a co-educational 11-18 maintained selective grammar school, situated in Alcester, Warwickshire, England.  On 1 April 2011, Alcester Grammar School became the first school in south Warwickshire to achieve academy status.

History
AGS was known as "Newport's Free School" from about 1592 until 1912 because Walter Newport provided in his will for the endowment which, in early years, paid the schoolmaster's stipend and enabled the scholars to be educated free of charge. Newport was a nephew of Sir Christopher Hatton, Lord Chancellor in 1597, and a relative of Robert, second Earl of Warwick.  In 1912, the new coeducational school now known as Alcester Grammar School, on the site in Birmingham Road came into use.

Admissions
For admissions at age 11 to Year 7 of the school, the Governing Body participates in the Local Authority’s co-ordinated admissions scheme for maintained secondary schools.  Admission to Year 7 is determined by the performance of candidates in an entrance examination and by the availability of places. Only students who attain the required standard in the prescribed arrangements for selection by reference to ability or aptitude will be eligible to be considered for admission to the school.

In September 2013 AGS increased its intake to 120 into Year 7, resulting in a 4 form entry of 30 students per form.

In September 2015, the Governing Body decided that it would admit up to 30 additional students into year 7 over the Published Admission Number (PAN) of 120.

From September 2016 the PAN for entry in year 7 will be 150 students, resulting in a 5 form entry of 30 students per form.

The priority circle for South Warwickshire Grammar Schools is based on the traditional area for application. It is based on a circle with a radius of 16.885 miles running from the American Fountain in Rother Street, Stratford-upon-Avon to the County boundary south of Long Compton.

Sixth form
At age 16 for year 12 (sixth form) students may be admitted providing they achieve a minimum of GCSE Grade B in four subjects and at least Grade C in Mathematics and English Language. Students should achieve at least a minimum of Grade B in the four subjects they select to study to A level. Subject specific variations to this latter requirement (e.g. where the corresponding GCSE subject was not available or an A or A* grade at GCSE is required) will be stated within the school’s sixth form prospectus.

Alcester Grammar School offers a unique environment for post-16 education.  It offers all students a degree of responsibility for their own learning and personal development, within a strong framework of support and guidance. This increases from year 12 to year 13. AGS offers a wide range of A level courses, with the freedom to choose any combination of four subjects, plus an optional Extended Project Qualification.

Overseas students
AGS may admit to the Sixth Form a small number of students who come from an overseas EEA country that does not take UK GCSEs provided their qualifications are deemed  acceptable to and compatible with the GCSE requirements stated above.

Results
The school receives consistently high GCSE results.

In 2015 99% of GCSE candidates achieved 5+ A*-C grades (or equivalent) including English and maths GCSEs. In 2015 99.8% of A level entries were at A*-E,  with 88% of A-Level entries achieving A*-C grades.

The 2017 League tables showed AGS to be the best performing grammar school in Warwickshire at 16-18 for progression.

School achievements
In 2012 Ofsted graded the school's Mathematics department as Outstanding.

In its 2006 and 2009 Ofsted inspections the school was graded as Outstanding.

Centenary
In 2012 AGS, which first opened in 1912, marked its Centenary with a host of celebratory events.

Notable former pupils

 James Cooray Smith, writer. 
 Simon Davis, comics artist 
 Sarah Douglas, actress  who played Ursa in Superman II
 Air Vice-Marshal Gerry Mayhew CBE, former Jaguar pilot, Station Commander from 2013-15 of RAF Leuchars
 Wendy Padbury, actress, known from 1968-69 for her Zoe Heriot companion to the second Doctor Who Patrick Troughton 
 Sadie Plant, founded the Cybernetic Culture Research Unit at the University of Warwick
 Andrew Pozzi, Olympic hurdler 
 Claire Ridgway, writer

References

External links
 Alcester Grammar School's Website
 Alcester Grammar School Sixth Form Website
 
 12 Telegraph Website

Grammar schools in Warwickshire
Academies in Warwickshire

Alcester